Sevi may refer to:
 Sibi, a town in Balochistan, Pakistan
 Sevi (crater), a crater on Mars
 Sevi (band), a Bulgarian rock band
 Sevi (singer) (born 1983), Bulgarian singer
 Merve Sevi (born 1987), Turkish actress
 Sevi Holmsten (1921–1993), Finnish rower